Zhary is a rural locality (a village) in Mstyora Urban Settlement, Vyaznikovsky District, Vladimir Oblast, Russia. The population was 17 as of 2010.

Geography 
Zhary is located 29 km northwest of Vyazniki (the district's administrative centre) by road. Ramenye is the nearest rural locality.

References 

Rural localities in Vyaznikovsky District